Agostino Masucci (c. 1691 – 19 October 1758) was an Italian painter of the late-Baroque or Rococo period.

Biography
Born in Rome, he initially apprenticed with Andrea Procaccino, and then became a member of the studio of Carlo Maratta. He joined the Accademia di San Luca in 1724, and from 1736 to 1738, he was director or Principe. Masucci worked for the House of Savoy, and also obtained commissions from John V of Portugal due to his friendship with Filippo Juvarra and  Luigi Vanvitelli. For example, for the latter he painted the main altarpiece of the Cathedral of Évora.

Masucci also made the models for the three main mosaic panels in the Chapel of St. John the Baptist, designed by Luigi Vanvitelli (along with Nicola Salvi) for King John V of Portugal. It was built in Rome starting in 1742, disassembled in 1747, and shipped to Lisbon, where it was reassembled in the Church of St. Roch (Igreja de São Roque). It was completed in 1750, although the mosaics in it were not finished until 1752. Built of many precious marbles and other costly stones, as well as gilt bronze, it was held to be the most expensive chapel in Europe up to that time.

For the Royal house of Savoy, he painted a series of historical canvases along with Giovanni Battista Pittoni, Sebastiano Conca, and Francesco Monti. Most of the works he completed, however, were in churches in Rome, including ovals in Santa Maria in Via Lata, and works in San Francesco di Paola, San Marcello al Corso, Santa Maria del Popolo, Santissimo Nome di Maria in Via Latina and Santa Maria Maggiore. He painted the Madonna with the Seven Founders of the Servite Order (c. 1728 found in the Art Institute of Chicago.

His academicism and grand-manner painting span styles from Baroque to incipient Neoclassicism. He was a tutor to Stefano Pozzi, Johann Zoffany, and Gavin Hamilton. He may have mentored Pompeo Batoni.

Sources
 Short biography.
 Short biography.

1690s births
1758 deaths
18th-century Italian people
17th-century Italian painters
Italian male painters
18th-century Italian painters
Painters from Rome
Italian Baroque painters
Pupils of Carlo Maratta
18th-century Italian male artists